The Leoganger Ache is a river of Salzburg, Austria, a left tributary of the Saalach.

The Leonganger Ache drains the valley of the same name, the Leoganger Tal. It originates near the border with Tyrol in Hütten, municipality of Leogang, at a height of  out of its two headstreams:

After half its way it passes through the municipality of Leogang. The Leoganger Valley falls openly and gently into the Saalfelden Basin.

The B 164 Hochkönig Road (which comes from Bischofshofen via Dienten and Saalfelden) runs along the Leoganger Valley over the Grießen Pass and via Fieberbrunn to St. Johann in Tirol – it is the only internal Austria link between Tyrol and the east that does not cross a high Alpine pass, but is also linked to Salzburg via the Little German Corner.

Rivers of Salzburg (state)
Rivers of Austria